Poznań Dębiec railway station is a railway station serving the south of the city of Poznań, in the Greater Poland Voivodeship, Poland. The station is located on the Wrocław–Poznań railway. The train services are operated by Przewozy Regionalne and Koleje Wielkopolskie.

Train services
The station is served by the following service(s):

Regional services (R) Wroclaw - Leszno - Poznan
Regional services (KW) Wolsztyn - Grodzisk Wielkopolski - Poznan

References

 This article is based upon a translation of the Polish language version as of June 2016.

External links
 

Dębiec
Railway stations in Greater Poland Voivodeship
Railway stations served by Przewozy Regionalne InterRegio
Railway stations in Poland opened in 1856